Crassuncus livingstoni is a moth of the family Pterophoridae. It is known from Malawi.

References

Endemic fauna of Malawi
Moths described in 2014
Oidaematophorini
Moths of Africa